Pseudodaphnella tincta is a species of sea snail, a marine gastropod mollusk in the family Raphitomidae.

Description
The length of the shell varies between 4 mm and 12 mm.

The longitudinal ribs of the white shell are strong, with revolving riblets reticulating them and with deep interstices. The sinus is broad.

The small, solid shell has a fusiform shape.  It is white with a series of brown spots below the suture on alternate ribs, and a brown band on the base. The sculpture consists of numerous longitudinal ribs slightly narrower than their intervals, and about 13 in number on the body whorl. These are crossed by spiral cords, narrower than their intervals, of which there are 6 on the body whorl, followed by a costate space, as though a cord had been omitted, and then 4 more beaded, oblique cords on the narrow, lower part of the whorl. The apex is broken off with 4½ whorls remainingt The body whorl shows a thick varix behind the outer lip. The aperture is narrow with two low teeth within the outer lip. The anal sinus is deep and rounded. (described as Clathurella centrosa)

Distribution
This marine species occurs in the Southwest Pacific and off Japan, the Philippines and Queensland, Australia.

References

 Reeve, L.A. 1846. Monograph of the genus Pleurotoma. pls 34–40 in Reeve, L.A. (ed). Conchologia Iconica. London : L. Reeve & Co. Vol. 1
 Schmeltz, J.D.K. 1869. Museum Godeffroy. Catalog 4. Hamburg : Wilhelm Mauke Söhne xxxix 141 pp.
 Pease, W.H. 1868. Synonymy of Marine Gasteropodae inhabiting Polynesia. Proceedings of the Zoological Society of London 4(3): 103-132 
 Dunker, G. 1871. Mollusca nova Musei Godeffroy Hamburgensis. Malakozoologische Blätter 18: 150–175 [
 Liu, J.Y. [Ruiyu] (ed.). (2008). Checklist of marine biota of China seas. China Science Press. 1267 pp.
 Adams, H. 1872. Descriptions of fourteen new species of land and marine shells. Proceedings of the Zoological Society of London 1872: 12-15; pl. 13 
 Melvill, J.C. 1917. A revision of the Turridae (Pleurotomidae) occurring in the Persian Gulf, Gulf of Oman and North Arabian Sea as evidenced mostly through the results of dredgings carried out by Mr. F.W. Townsend, 1893-1914. Proceedings of the Malacological Society of London 12(4-5): 140-201
 Powell, A.W.B. 1966. The molluscan families Speightiidae and Turridae, an evaluation of the valid taxa, both Recent and fossil, with list of characteristic species. Bulletin of the Auckland Institute and Museum. Auckland, New Zealand 5: 1–184, pls 1–23 
 Maes, V.O. 1967. The littoral marine mollusks of Cocos-Keeling Islands (Indian Ocean). Proceedings of the Academy of Natural Sciences, Philadelphia 119: 93–217

External links
 
 Brazier, J. 1876. A list of the Pleurotomidae collected during the Chevert expedition, with the description of the new species. Proceedings of the Linnean Society of New South Wales 1: 151–162
 Pilsbry H.A. (1904). New Japanese marine Mollusca: Gastropoda. Proceedings of the Academy of Natural Sciences of Philadelphia. 56: 3-32 [10 February], 33-37
 Kilburn, R. N. (2009). Genus Kermia (Mollusca: Gastropoda: Conoidea: Conidae: Raphitominae) in South African Waters, with Observations on the Identities of Related Extralimital Species. African Invertebrates. 50(2): 217-236
 Fedosov A. E. & Puillandre N. (2012) Phylogeny and taxonomy of the Kermia–Pseudodaphnella (Mollusca: Gastropoda: Raphitomidae) genus complex: a remarkable radiation via diversification of larval development. Systematics and Biodiversity 10(4): 447-477
 Gastropods.com: Pseudodaphnella tincta
  Hedley, C. 1922. A revision of the Australian Turridae. Records of the Australian Museum 13(6): 213-359, pls 42-56 

tincta
Gastropods described in 1846